Gangotri is a 2003 Indian Telugu-language drama film which was released on 28 March 2003 and was directed by K. Raghavendra Rao. The cinematography was by Chota K. Naidu. The actors Allu Arjun and Aditi Agarwal played the leading roles. This was Allu Arjun's debut as an actor and K. Raghavendra Rao's 100th film as a director. Allu Aravind and C. Ashwini Dutt produced the film.

Plot 
Neelakantham Naidu is a big factionist who has a loyal confidant Narasimha, who is willing to give his life for the sake of his master. After many years, Neelakantham's wife Tulasi gives birth to a baby girl, but all the earlier babies born to Neelakantham died due to some unknown reason. The priests advise Neelakantham to name his daughter Gangotri. They also warn Neelakantham that the child has 'jalagandam', hence they ask him to take Gangotri to the holy place of Gangotri (after which she was named) in the Himalayas and perform 'abhyangana snanam' (bathe with turmeric, milk, etc.) for the next 15 years. After 15 years, Gangotri would be free of any danger. When nobody could entertain the child Gangotri, Simhadri, the son of Narasimha, entertains her with a song. Simhadri becomes a servant and friend to Gangotri.

They grow up together. Simhadri and Gangotri become good friends. In the meantime, Simhadri's mother is shot by a bullet in a trap with bombs while trying to save Neelakantham. When Gangotri attains puberty, her paternal aunt restricts Simhadri from meeting Gangotri as it would be wrong. When Simhadri comes to Gangotri's place clandestinely to meet her, they are caught by Neelakantham. Neelakantham's sister speaks badly about their relationship. Neelakantham then beats Simhadri.

Meanwhile, Narasimha comes to the spot and interferes. This causes a rift between Neelakantham and Narasimha. Neelakantham is misinformed about Narasimha's intentions; hence, he has bombs planted in Narasimha's house. Simhadri is away at that time. When Simhadri discovers that Neelakantham is responsible for the bombing, he goes to Neelakantham's house and challenges that he will marry Gangotri in a year. Then, Simhadri goes to the holy place of Gangotri and waits for his lover to come there for the final sacred bath. They try to elope, but Neelakantham stabs Simhadri with a sword, and Gangotri tries to commit suicide, which makes Neelakantham realize their love. Simhadri then gains consciousness with their favorite flute tune and gets back his love, and they both hug each other.

Cast 
Allu Arjun as Simhadri
Aditi Agarwal as Gangotri
Prakash Raj as Neelakantham Naidu
Suman as Narasimha
Seetha as Simhadri's mother
Pragathi as Tulasi
Telangana Shakuntala as Durgamma
Brahmanandam as Hindi Lecturer
Sunil as Exam Invigilator
Tanikella Bharani as Anjaneya Shastri
M. S. Narayana
Subbaraya Sharma
A.V.S.
Banerjee
Sobha
Master Teja Sajja as Young Simhadri
Kavya Kalyan Ram as Young Gangotri

Soundtrack

The music was composed By M. M. Keeravani and released by Aditya Music.

Release
The film was later dubbed into Malayalam and Hindi under the name Simhakutty (2009) and Gangotri (2014 by Goldmines Telefilms) respectively. .

Awards

 Allu Arjun won the Nandi Award for Best Debut Hero
 Allu Arjun won the Santosham Best Young Performers Award
 Allu Arjun won the CineMAA Award for Best Male Debut
 Prakash Raj won the Nandi Award for Best Villain

References

External links 
 

2003 films
2000s Telugu-language films
Indian romantic drama films
Indian romantic musical films
Indian teen romance films
2003 romantic drama films
2000s romantic musical films
2000s teen romance films
Cross-dressing in Indian films
Films directed by K. Raghavendra Rao
Geetha Arts films
Films scored by M. M. Keeravani
Films set in Uttarakhand
Films shot in Uttarakhand